Byrsophyllum is a genus of flowering plants in the family Rubiaceae. It belongs to the subfamily Ixoroideae and the tribe Gardenieae.

The genus is native to India and Sri Lanka.

Species
 Byrsophyllum ellipticum (Thwaites) Hook.f. - Sri Lanka
 Byrsophyllum tetrandrum (Bedd.) Hook.f. - India

References

 
Rubiaceae genera
Taxonomy articles created by Polbot
Taxa named by Joseph Dalton Hooker